The Tam Tri Sai Gon General Hospital (Abbreviation: Tam Tri Sai Gon or TTSG; Vietnamese: Bệnh viện Đa Khoa Tâm Trí Sài Gòn) is the flagship hospital of TMMC Healthcare. It is located in the northern part of Ho Chi Minh City, Viet Nam.

History 
It was established in 2001 and incorporated in 2014 into TMMC Healthcare.

With bed capacity of over 200, the hospital admits hundreds of outpatient visit a day, and 20% of medical tourists whom are foreign patients from 60 countries all over the world.

Quick facts 
 11,000 Admissions per year
 180,000 Outpatient visits per year
 83 Physicians

Division of Medicine 

  Anesthesiology
  Cardiology
  Dentistry
  Dermatology
  Diagnostic Radiology
  Emergency Medicine
  Endocrinology
  ENT (Ear, Nose and Throat)
  Family Medicine
  Gastroenterology
  Gynecology
  Hematology
  Infectious diseases
  Internal Medicine
  Medical Oncology
  Nephrology
  Neurology
  Obstetrics
  Ophthalmology
  Pediatric Medicine
  Psychiatric Medicine
  Pulmonary tuberculosis

Division of Surgery 
 Colorectal Surgery
 General Surgery
 Hand Surgery
 Hepatology
 Neurosurgery
 Orthopedic Surgery
 Plastic Surgery
 Surgical Oncology

Clinical support services 

 Chemotherapy
 Clinical Laboratory
 Diabetes Center
 Diagnostic and Imaging
 Family Outpatient Clinic
 Health Assessment Centre
 International Patient Centre
 Occupational Therapy
 Pain Management Centre
 Pharmacy
 Physiotherapy
 Radiotherapy
 Rehabilitation Center

References

External links
 

Hospitals in Ho Chi Minh City